Ashley Devia Rodrigues (born 12 September 1988) is a Canadian-born Guyanese retired footballer who played as a forward. She has been a member of the Guyana women's national team.

College career
Rodrigues played at Eastern Michigan.

International goals
Scores and results list Guyana's goal tally first

See also
List of Guyana women's international footballers

References

External links 
 

1988 births
Living people
Citizens of Guyana through descent
Guyanese women's footballers
Women's association football forwards
Eastern Michigan Eagles women's soccer players
Guyana women's international footballers
Guyanese expatriate footballers
Guyanese expatriate sportspeople in the United States
Expatriate women's soccer players in the United States
People from Pickering, Ontario
Soccer people from Ontario
Canadian expatriate women's soccer players
Canadian expatriate sportspeople in the United States
Canadian sportspeople of Guyanese descent